Behrang Stesen （Jawi: بيهراڠ ستيسين; ） is a small town in Muallim District, Perak, Malaysia. It is situated within the parliamentary constituency of Tanjung Malim.

Attractions
Sungai Bil Waterfall, a waterfall located at Behrang Ulu.

Muallim District
Towns in Perak